Nassim Nicholas Taleb (alternatively Nessim or Nissim; born 12 September 1960)  is a Lebanese-American essayist, mathematical statistician, former option trader, risk analyst, and aphorist whose work concerns problems of randomness, probability, and uncertainty. The Sunday Times called his 2007 book The Black Swan one of the 12 most influential books since World War II.

Taleb is the author of the Incerto, a five-volume philosophical essay on uncertainty published between 2001 and 2018 (of which the best-known books are The Black Swan and Antifragile). He has been a professor at several universities, serving as a Distinguished Professor of Risk Engineering at the New York University Tandon School of Engineering since September 2008. He has been co-editor-in-chief of the academic journal Risk and Decision Analysis since September 2014. He has also been a practitioner of mathematical finance, a hedge fund manager, and a derivatives trader, and is currently listed as a scientific adviser at Universa Investments.

Taleb criticized the risk management methods used by the finance industry and warned about financial crises, subsequently profiting from the late-2000s financial crisis. He advocates what he calls a "black swan robust" society, meaning a society that can withstand difficult-to-predict events. He proposes what he has termed "antifragility" in systems; that is, an ability to benefit and grow from a certain class of random events, errors, and volatility as well as "convex tinkering" as a method of scientific discovery, by which he means that decentralized experimentation outperforms directed research.

Early life and family background

Taleb was born in Amioun, Lebanon, to Minerva Ghosn and Nagib Taleb, a physician/oncologist and a researcher in anthropology. His parents were of Antiochian Greek descent, holding French citizenship. His grandfather, and his great-grandfather, were both deputy prime ministers in the 1940s through the 1970s. His paternal grandfather Nassim Taleb was a supreme court judge and his great-great-great-great-grandfather, Ibrahim Taleb (Nabbout), was a governor of Mount Lebanon in 1866. Taleb attended a French school there, the Grand Lycée Franco-Libanais in Beirut. His family saw its political prominence and wealth reduced by the Lebanese Civil War, which began in 1975. He is a Greek Orthodox Christian.

Education
Taleb received his bachelor and Master of Science degrees from the University of Paris. He holds an MBA from the Wharton School at the University of Pennsylvania (1983), and a PhD in management science from the University of Paris (Dauphine) (1998), under the direction of Hélyette Geman. His dissertation focused on the mathematics of derivatives pricing.

According to a profile in Le Monde, Taleb claims to read in ten languages.

Finance view
Taleb has been a practitioner of mathematical finance, a hedge fund manager, and a derivatives trader. He is a scientific adviser at Universa Investments.

Taleb considers himself less a businessman than an epistemologist of randomness, and says that he used trading to attain independence and freedom from authority. He was a pioneer of tail risk hedging (now sometimes called "black swan protection"), which is intended to mitigate investors' exposure to extreme market moves. His business model has been to safeguard investors against crises while reaping rewards from rare events, and thus his investment management career has included several jackpots followed by lengthy dry spells.

He has also held the following positions: managing director and proprietary trader at Credit Suisse UBS, worldwide chief proprietary arbitrage derivatives trader for currencies, commodities and non-dollar fixed income at First Boston, chief currency derivatives trader for Banque Indosuez, managing director and worldwide head of financial option arbitrage at CIBC Wood Gundy, derivatives arbitrage trader at Bankers Trust (now Deutsche Bank), proprietary trader at BNP Paribas, independent option market maker on the Chicago Mercantile Exchange and founder of Empirica Capital.

Taleb reportedly became financially independent after the crash of 1987 and was successful during the Nasdaq dive in 2000 as well as the financial crisis that began in 2007, a development he attributed to the mismatch between reality and statistical distributions used in finance. After that crisis, Taleb became an activist for what he called a "black swan robust society". Since 2007 he has been a Principal/Senior Scientific Adviser at Universa Investments in Miami, Florida, a fund based on the "black swan" idea, owned and managed by former Empirica partner Mark Spitznagel. Some of its separate funds made returns of 65% to 115% in October 2008. In a 2007 Wall Street Journal article, Taleb claimed he retired from trading in 2004 and became a full-time author. He describes the nature of his involvement as "totally passive" from 2010 on.

Academic career
Taleb changed careers and became a mathematical researcher, scholar and philosophical essayist in 2006, and has held positions at NYU's Courant Institute of Mathematical Sciences, at University of Massachusetts Amherst, at London Business School, and at Oxford University. He has been Distinguished Professor of Risk Engineering at New York University Tandon School of Engineering since 2008. He was Distinguished Research Scholar at the Said Business School BT Center, University of Oxford from 2009 to 2013.

Taleb is co-Editor in Chief of the academic journal Risk and Decision Analysis (since September 2014), jointly teaches regular courses with Paul Wilmott in London (19th time, March 2015), and occasionally participates in teaching courses toward the Certificate in Quantitative Finance. He is also co-faculty at the New England Complex Systems Institute.

In late 2015, Taleb, Robert J. Frey and Raphael Douady formed the Real World Risk Institute "to build the principles and methodology for what we call real-world rigor, in decision making and codify a clear-cut way to approach ... to provide executive education courses and issue two certificates."

Writing career
Taleb's five volume philosophical essay on uncertainty, titled Incerto, covers the following books: Fooled by Randomness (2001), The Black Swan (2007–2010), The Bed of Procrustes (2010), Antifragile (2012), and Skin in the Game (2018). It was originally published in November 2016 including only the first four books. The fifth book was added in August 2019.

His first non-technical book, Fooled by Randomness, about the underestimation of the role of randomness in life, published in 2001, was selected by Fortune as one of the smartest 75 books known.

His second non-technical book, The Black Swan, about unpredictable events, was published in 2007, selling close to three million copies (as of February 2011). It spent 36 weeks on the New York Times Bestseller list, 17 as hardcover and 19 weeks as paperback, and was translated into 31 languages. The book has been credited with predicting the banking and economic crisis of 2008.

A book of aphorisms, The Bed of Procrustes: Philosophical and Practical Aphorisms, was released in December 2010.

The fourth book of his Incerto series—Antifragile: Things That Gain from Disorder—was published in November 2012.

The fifth book of his Incerto series—Skin in the Game: Hidden Asymmetries in Daily Life—was published in February 2018.

Taleb's non-technical writing style has been described as mixing a narrative, often semi-autobiographical style with short philosophical tales and historical and scientific commentary. The sales of Taleb's first two books garnered an advance of $4 million, for a follow-up book on anti-fragility.

Ideas and theories

Taleb's book The Bed of Procrustes summarizes the central problem: "we humans, facing limits of knowledge, and things we do not observe, the unseen and the unknown, resolve the tension by squeezing life and the world into crisp commoditized ideas". Taleb disagrees with Platonism (i.e., theoretical) approaches to reality to the extent that they lead people to have the wrong map of reality, rather than no map at all. He opposes most economic and grand social science theorizing, which in his view, suffers acutely from the problem of overuse of Plato's theory of forms. Based on these and other constructions, he advocates for what he calls a "black swan robust" society, meaning a society that can withstand difficult-to-predict events.

He has also proposed that biological, economic, and other systems exhibit an ability to benefit and grow from volatility—including particular types of random errors and events—a characteristic of these systems that he terms antifragility. Relatedly, he also believes that universities are better at public relations and claiming credit than generating knowledge. He argues that knowledge and technology are usually generated by what he calls "stochastic tinkering" rather than by top-down directed research, and has proposed option-like experimentation as a way to outperform directed research as a method of scientific discovery, an approach he terms convex tinkering.

Taleb has called for cancellation of the Nobel Prize in Economics, saying that the damage from economic theories can be devastating. He opposes top-down knowledge as an academic illusion. Together with Espen Gaarder Haug, Taleb asserts that option pricing is determined in a "heuristic way" by operators, not by a model, and that models are "lecturing birds on how to fly". Teacher and author Pablo Triana has explored this topic with reference to Haug and Taleb, and says that perhaps Taleb is correct to urge that banks be treated as utilities forbidden to take potentially lethal risks, while hedge funds and other unregulated entities should be able to do what they want.

In his writings, Taleb has identified and discussed the error of comparing real-world randomness with the "structured randomness" in quantum physics where probabilities are computable or games of chance such as casino gambling in which the probabilities are purposefully constructed by the proprietors. Taleb calls this the "ludic fallacy". He argues that predictive models suffer from Platonism, gravitating towards mathematical purity and failing to take some key ideas into account, such as: the impossibility of possessing all relevant information, that small unknown variations in the data can have a huge impact, and flawed theories/models that are based on empirical data and that fail to consider events that have not taken place, but could have taken place. Discussing the ludic fallacy in The Black Swan, he writes, "The dark side of the moon is harder to see; beaming light on it costs energy. In the same way, beaming light on the unseen is costly, in both computational and mental effort."

In the second edition of The Black Swan, he posited that the foundations of quantitative economics are faulty and highly self-referential. He states that statistics is fundamentally incomplete as a field, as it cannot predict the risk of rare events, a problem that is acute in proportion to the rarity of these events. With the mathematician Raphael Douady, he called the problem statistical undecidability (Douady and Taleb, 2010).

Taleb has described his main challenge as mapping his ideas of "robustification" and "antifragility", that is, how to live and act in a world we do not understand and build robustness to black swan events. Taleb introduced the idea of the "fourth quadrant" in the exposure domain. One of its applications is in his definition of the most effective (that is, least fragile) risk management approach: what he calls the "barbell strategy" which is based on avoiding the middle in favor of linear combination of extremes, across all domains from politics to economics to one's personal life. These are deemed by Taleb to be more robust to estimation errors. For instance, he suggests that investing money in 'medium risk' investments is pointless, because risk is difficult, if not impossible to compute. His preferred strategy is to be both hyper-conservative and hyper-aggressive at the same time. For example, an investor might put 80 to 90% of their money in extremely safe instruments, such as treasury bills, with the remainder going into highly risky and diversified speculative bets. An alternative suggestion is to engage in highly speculative bets with a limited downside.

Taleb asserts that by adopting these strategies a portfolio can be "robust", that is, gain a positive exposure to black swan events while limiting losses suffered by such random events. Together with Donald Geman and Hélyette Geman, he modeled the "maximum entropy barbell" which consists in "to constrain only what can be constrained (in a robust manner) and to maximize entropy elsewhere", based on an insight by E. T. Jaynes that economic life increases in entropy under regulatory and other constraints. Taleb also applies a similar barbell-style approach to health and exercise. Instead of doing steady and moderate exercise daily, he suggests that it is better to do a low-effort exercise such as walking slowly most of the time, while occasionally expending extreme effort. He claims that the human body evolved to live in a random environment, with various unexpected but intense efforts and much rest.

He appeared as a special guest on The Ron Paul Liberty Report on 19 May 2017, and stated his support for a non-interventionist foreign policy. Taleb subsequently appeared with Ron Paul and Ralph Nader on their respective shows in support of Skin in the Game, which was dedicated to both men.

Taleb wrote in Antifragile and in scientific papers that if the statistical structure of habits in modern society differ too greatly from the ancestral environment of humanity, the analysis of consumption should focus less on composition and more on frequency. In other words, studies that ignore the random nature of supply of nutrients are invalid.

Taleb co-authored a paper with Yaneer Bar-Yam and Joseph Norman called Systemic risk of pandemic via novel pathogens – Coronavirus: A note. The paper published on 26 January 2020, took the position that the SARS-CoV-2 was not being taken seriously enough by policy makers and medical professionals.

Praise and criticism
In a 2008 article in The Times, the journalist Bryan Appleyard described Taleb as "now the hottest thinker in the world". The Nobel Laureate Daniel Kahneman proposed the inclusion of Taleb's name among the world's top intellectuals, saying "Taleb has changed the way many people think about uncertainty, particularly in the financial markets. His book, The Black Swan, is an original and audacious analysis of the ways in which humans try to make sense of unexpected events." Taleb attended the World Economic Forum annual meeting in Davos in 2009; at that event he had harsh words for bankers, suggesting that bankers' recklessness will not be repeated "if you have punishment".

Taleb contends that statisticians can be pseudoscientists when it comes to risks of rare events and risks of blowups, and mask their incompetence with complicated equations. This stance has attracted criticism: the American Statistical Association devoted the August 2007 issue of The American Statistician to The Black Swan. The magazine offered a mixture of praise and criticism for Taleb's main points, with a focus on Taleb's writing style and his representation of the statistical literature. Robert Lund, a mathematics professor at Clemson University, writes that in Black Swan, Taleb is "reckless at times and subject to grandiose overstatements; the professional statistician will find the book ubiquitously naive." However, Lund acknowledges that "there are many points where I agree with Taleb," and writes that "the book is a must" for anyone "remotely interested in finance and/or philosophical probability."

Aaron Brown, an author, quantitative analyst, and adjunct professor in finance at Yeshiva and Fordham Universities, said regarding The Black Swan that "the book reads as if Taleb has never heard of nonparametric methods, data analysis, visualization tools or robust estimation." Nonetheless, he calls the book "essential reading" and urges statisticians to overlook the insults to get the "important philosophic and mathematical truths." Taleb replied in the second edition of The Black Swan that "One of the most common (but useless) comments I hear is that some solutions can come from 'robust statistics.' I wonder how using these techniques can create information where there is none". While praising the book, Westfall and Hilbe in 2007 complained that Taleb's criticism is "often unfounded and sometimes outrageous." Taleb, writes John Kay, "describes writers and professionals as knaves or fools, mostly fools. His writing is full of irrelevances, asides and colloquialisms, reading like the conversation of a raconteur rather than a tightly argued thesis. But it is hugely enjoyable – compelling but easy to dip into. Yet beneath his rage and mockery are serious issues. The risk management models in use today exclude the very events against which they claim to protect the businesses that employ them. These models import a veneer of technical sophistication ... Quantitative analysts have lulled corporate executives and regulators into an illusory sense of security." Berkeley statistician David Freedman said that efforts by statisticians to refute Taleb's stance have been unconvincing.

Taleb and Nobel laureate Myron Scholes have traded personal attacks, particularly after Taleb's paper with Espen Haug on why nobody used the Black–Scholes–Merton formula. Taleb said that Scholes was responsible for the financial crises of 2008, and suggested that "this guy should be in a retirement home doing Sudoku. His funds have blown up twice. He shouldn't be allowed in Washington to lecture anyone on risk." Scholes retorted that Taleb simply "popularises ideas and is making money selling books". Scholes claimed that Taleb does not cite previous literature, and for this reason Taleb is not taken seriously in academia. Haug and Taleb (2011) listed hundreds of research documents showing the Black–Scholes formula was not Scholes' at all, and argued that the economics establishment ignored literature by practitioners and mathematicians (such as Ed Thorp), who had developed a more sophisticated version of the formula.

In an interview on Charlie Rose, Taleb said that he saw that none of the criticism he received for The Black Swan refuted his central point, which convinced him to protect his assets and those of his clients.

Taleb's aggressive and clearly directed commentary against parts of the finance industry—e.g., stating at Davos in 2009 that he was "happy" that Lehman Brothers collapsed—has led to reports of personal attacks and possible threats.

Honors 
 2009: Included on the Forbes magazine list of "Most Influential Management Gurus"
 2011: Included on the Bloomberg 50 most influential people in global finance
 2013, 2014, 2015: Included among most influential 100 thought leaders in the world by the Gottlieb Duttweiler Institute
 2016: Taleb received an honorary doctorate from the American University of Beirut.
 2018: Wolfram Innovator Award for contributions to decision making under complicated and less-idealized probabilistic structures using Mathematica.

Major works

Books

Incerto
Incerto is a group of works by Taleb as philosophical essays on uncertainty. It was bundled into a group of four works in November 2016 . A fifth book, Skin in the Game, was published in February 2018. This fifth book is bundled with the other four works in July 2019 as Incerto (Deluxe Edition) .
  Second ed., 2005. .
  Expanded 2nd ed, 2010 .
  Expanded 2nd ed, 2016 .
 
  (This book was not published with the original bundling of the Incerto series.)

Technical Incerto

Other

Selection of papers
 
 Taleb, N.N.; Norman, J.; Bar-Yam, Y; (26 January 2020) "Systemic Risk of Pandemic via Novel Pathogens – Coronavirus: A Note". Academia.edu. Systemic Risk of Pandemic via Novel Pathogens – Coronavirus: A Note

See also
 Applications of randomness
 List of American philosophers
 Taleb distribution
 Dragon King Theory

Notes

References

External links

 Nassim Taleb's home page
 
 
 

 
1960 births
Living people
20th-century Eastern Orthodox Christians
21st-century American essayists
21st-century American male writers
21st-century American non-fiction writers
21st-century American philosophers
21st-century Eastern Orthodox Christians
American male non-fiction writers
Aphorists
Courant Institute of Mathematical Sciences faculty
Critics of political economy
Epistemologists
Greek Orthodox Christians from Lebanon
Greek Orthodox Christians from the United States
Lebanese Christians
Lebanese emigrants to the United States
Lebanese philosophers
Monte Carlo methodologists
New England Complex Systems Institute
Non-interventionism
Paris Dauphine University alumni
People from Koura District
Polytechnic Institute of New York University faculty
University of Massachusetts Amherst faculty
University of Paris alumni
Wharton School of the University of Pennsylvania alumni
Mathematical statisticians